Thaanaa Serndha Koottam is a 2018 Indian Tamil-language crime comedy film directed by Vignesh Shivan. The film stars Suriya, alongside Karthik, Ramya Krishnan, Keerthy Suresh, Nandha, Kalaiyarasan, RJ Balaji, and Suresh Chandra Menon. The film's music was composed by Anirudh Ravichander and cinematography performed by Dinesh B. Krishnan and edited by A. Sreekar Prasad. It is a remake of the 2013 Hindi film Special 26, which was inspired by the true event 1987 Opera House heist in Mumbai.

Principal photography of the film commenced in September 2016 and ended in August 2017. Thaana Serndha Kootam had a worldwide theatrical release on 12 January 2018. It received generally positive reviews from critics and audience with praise for the performances of the cast(especially Suriya and Karthik), writing, direction, screenplay, social message, background score and soundtrack. The film was a box office success.

Plot 
All the events in this movie happen in the period of 1986–1987. The film begins with Pallavaram Paranjothi Pandian attending an interview for a clerk's post and getting rejected due to lack of money for giving bribes to the officials.

Now the story shifts to Nachinarkiniyan aka Iniyan attending CBI interviews and his friend attending police interviews. Both are rejected due to lack of bribe money for the post. Iniyan's father Porchelvan works as a CBI office clerk. He wants his son to be an officer, hence he pleads for the posting for his son to his higher officials.

However, he earned the wrath of his senior official officer Uthaman, a corrupt official. Once during a raid, he asks for money. Porchelvan did not approve of this and complains about Uthaman in the form of an anonymous letter. Uthaman learns of this and exacts revenge by purposely rejecting and humiliating Iniyan at the interview and later asking him to bribe in order to get the job. Iniyan and his father are dejected, and Iniyan's friend is dejected due to his failure in the interview, and he later commits suicide.

Iniyan is depressed after all these events and decides to loot money from the corrupted and rich people. He loots black money and tries to reform society, making sure the deserved people get posting in the government departments. He forms a gang with him and starts to heist by posing as CBI and income tax officers.

The CBI appoints Kurunjivendhan to investigate and capture the thieves. Meanwhile, Iniyan falls in love with Madhu, and she accepts his marriage proposal. One day, the gang conducts an interview for the CBI (fake). The gang plans to raid a jewelry shop. Uthaman and Kurunjivendhan come to know about this, but learn that they already came and finished the raid. Kurunjivendhan apprehends Iniyan and wants him to be a police inspector, but he rejects the offer as he believes that even more good can be done if he continued to do his deeds. He then reveals the force with Kurunjivendhan is actually the men he gave jobs using the heist money. He escapes the place with ease.

Cast 

 Suriya as Nachinarkiniyan (Iniyan)/Uthaman (during raids)
 Karthik as Kurunjivendhan CBI Officer
 Ramya Krishnan as Azhagu Meena (Jhansi Rani)
 Kalaiyarasan as Iniyan's friend
 RJ Balaji as 'Pallavaram' Paranjothi Pandian
 Keerthy Suresh as Madhu
 Senthil as KP
 Sathyan as Muthukumar "Muthu"
 Sivasankar as Ondiveeran "Ondi"
 Nandha as Police Inspector Vetrivel/Manga Madayan
 Suresh Chandra Menon as Uthaman (Voice Dubbed by Gautam Vasudev Menon)
 Thambi Ramaiah as Porchelvan
 Brahmanandam as a Hyderabad Income Tax Officer
 Anandaraj as Kuthalingam (Gandhi Appa)
 Yogi Babu as Narayanan
 Sudhakar as Azhagu Meena's husband
 Nirosha as Kuthalingam's wife
 Vinodhini as Mangaiyakarasi
 Bala Singh as Gunasekaran
 Venkatesh Harinathan as Kapil Gavaskar
 Gadam Kishan as Kapil's brother
 Abhirami as Azhagumathi (Azhagu Meena's daughter)
 Winner Ramachandran

Production

Development 
Following the success of Neeraj Pandey's Special 26 (2013), the director revealed that he was approached by several film makers who were keen on producing a Tamil version of the film. Linguswamy subsequently bought the rights of the film and planned to produce the venture in collaboration with Friday Filmworks, who had made the original version. Linguswamy held initial discussions with Kamal Haasan, Suriya, Karthi and Vikram about portraying the film's lead role with Sathyaraj, but the production failed to materialise. In August 2014, producer Thiagarajan announced that he had purchased the Tamil, Telugu, Malayalam and Kannada language rights to remake Special 26, and revealed that he would also direct all four ventures. Thiagarajan's son Prashanth was revealed to be playing the lead role in the Tamil version, while Prakash Raj and Sathyaraj were signed to portray supporting roles. A further press release in March 2015 stated that Srikanth Ravichandran, then husband of television host Divyadarshini, would instead direct the film and that he had already begun work on planning music compositions with Thaman. The team also revealed that they had signed on actress Trisha to feature in the leading female role. After a period of little development, Prashanth revealed to the media in September 2015 that the film's shoot would commence soon after with Madhesh as the director of the project.

A press release in December 2015 suggested that Simran and Devayani would also be a part of the cast, while Jacqueline Fernandez would appear in a song. It was also stated that Anirudh Ravichander had been signed on to compose the film's music and Sreekar Prasad would be the film's editor. Thiagarajan revealed that he would adapt the original film's script and dialogues to suit a Tamil audience and that filming would take place in Delhi, Kolkata, Mumbai and Chennai. The film failed to materialise over 2016 and it was widely reported in the media that the remake rights of the original film had been transferred from Thiagarajan to Studio Green and the film was to be made as Thaana Serndha Kootam by Vignesh Shivan with Suriya in the lead role. The title was taken from a dialogue spoken by Rajinikanth in Baashha (1995).

However, in an interview during February 2017, Thiagarajan insisted that the film was still being planned with Prashanth in the lead role. In late 2017, Thiagarajan made an application seeking an interim stay of the film's release, claiming that his studio of Staar Movies still owned the film's rights. He stated that Staar Movies had entered into an agreement with the original producers, Viacom, in August 2014 and obtained the rights to remake the movie in Tamil, Telugu, Malayalam and Kannada and that the agreement was valid for a period of three years. In early January 2018, the High Court refused the interim order application and called for the issues to be decided in a civil claim.

Filming 
Vignesh Shivan agreed to work on Thaanaa Serndha Koottam at short notice, after another project, Kaathu Vaakula Rendu Kaadhal with Vijay Sethupathi, Nayanthara and Samantha Ruth Prabhu became delayed. Studio Green's K. E. Gnanavel Raja asked Vignesh to do a project to star Suriya and the team chos to use an earlier script planned by Vignesh on the 1987 Opera House heist, like Special 26, where a group posing as Central Bureau of Investigation (CBI) officers executed an income tax raid on the jeweller in Mumbai, which he initially wanted to make with either actors Sivakarthikeyan or Vijay Sethupathi. The team claimed to legally purchase the remake rights of Special 26, but instead of copying the film scene-by-scene, Vignesh was insistent that it was adapted to make it suitable for Tamil-speaking audiences. The film was announced to the public in September 2016, with the shoot starting thereafter in October 2016. Keerthy Suresh was signed on as the lead actress, while an ensemble cast of veteran actors including Ramya Krishnan, Suresh Chandra Menon, Senthil and Sudhakar were also a part of the first schedule. Suresh Chandra Menon initially dubbed in his own voice, but it was later replaced with Gautham Menon's voice.

The film was predominantly shot across Chennai and Mysore, with the shoot finishing in August 2017. Post-production works for the film were completed at Knack Studios in Chennai. The film was also dubbed Hindi as well as in Telugu as Surya Ki Gang and Gang, respectively with Suriya choosing to dub for himself for the Telugu version titled Gang for the first time.

Music 

Vignesh Shivan teamed up with Anirudh Ravichander to compose the soundtrack and background score of the film, once again after Naanum Rowdydhaan. This film also marks the first collaboration of Anirudh with Suriya. The tracklist features five songs, with lyrics for songs were written by Thamarai, Vignesh Shivan and Mani Amudhavan, where the former and latter penned two songs each and the rest of the songs were penned by Vignesh Shivan.

Sony Music acquired the rights of the soundtrack album. The first single track "Naana Thaana" was released on 26 July 2017, sung by Anirudh himself with lyrics written by Vignesh Shivan. On 16 October 2017, coinciding with Anirudh Ravichander's birthday the teaser of the second single "Sodakku" was released of YouTube. The full song was released on 26 October 2017. The promotional video song of "Sodakku" was released on 27 October 2017, featuring members of the film's cast as well as Sheril, who rose to fame with her dance cover of the song "Entammede Jimikki Kammal" from Velipadinte Pusthakam (2017).

Another single track "Peela Peela" was released on 23 December 2017. The title track of Thaana Serndha Koottam, was released on 30 December 2017. The video jukebox and full album of the movie was unveiled on 6 January 2018. The soundtrack album of its Hindi version Surya Ki Gang  and its Telugu version Gang, were released on 10 January 2018.

Track listing 

All lyrics written by Niharika Baijal.

Reception 

A critic from Behindwoods.com noted "Anirudh's magical combination with Vignesh Shivan continues as the album shines high on variety", and gave the album a rating of 3.25 out of 5 stars. Another reviewer from The Times of India wrote "Anirudh and Vignesh's combination has worked again – and the composer only proves, time and again, to experiment and give some fine tracks for each album he works on". Firstpost reviewed the soundtrack as "The album is low on romance, but high on fun". Studioflicks rated the soundtrack as 3.25 out of 5, stating that "Thaana Serndha Koottam brings us a much valuable package of tracks based on different genres. Moreover, for Suriya this is a real big success for most of his erstwhile albums weren’t the favourite of music lovers. Anirudh and Vignesh Shivn encompass best music with simple lyrics and right choice of singers to offer the best treat to everyone."

Controversy 

The song "Sodakku" attracted controversy after an AIADMK office bearer, Sathish Kumar, lodged a complaint with the Commissioner of Police seeking changes in the lyrics, which he claimed were offensive and anti-political. Kumar's claims were widely criticised by those in the film industry, with RJ Balaji speaking out against the complaint.

Marketing 
The first look was released on 23 July 2017, coinciding with Suriya's birthday. The teaser of the film was released on 30 November 2017, gaining positive reviews. Another poster was released on December clarifying that the film is slated for Pongal release.

Release 
Thaana Serndha Kootam got a worldwide release on 12 January 2018, two days before the Thai Pongal festival. It was dubbed and released into Telugu as Gang and in Hindi as Surya Ki Gang  and released on the same day.

Awards and nominations
Filmfare Awards South
Filmfare Award for Best Male Playback Singer - Tamil - Anthony Daasan - Sodakku mela sodakku-Nominated
Filmfare Award for Best Lyricist - Tamil - Vignesh Shivan - Sodakku mela Sodakku-Nominated
Filmfare Award for Best Supporting Actress - Tamil-Ramya Krishnan - Nominated

Critical reception 
The film opened to generally positive reviews. The Times Of India rated 3.5 out of 5 stars stating "The film works wonderfully well as long as it stays closer to the plot of Special 26, and the changes are superficial."India Today rated 2.5 stars out of 5 stating that "The film Thaanaa Serndha Koottam, starring Suriya released today and our review says that the film has not lived up to the original, Special 26."Firstpost rated 3 out of 5 stars stating "TSK is an enjoyable ride for the entire family, and it’s refreshing to see Suriya back in form."Sify rated 3 out of 5 stars stating "It’s Suriyas committed performance, that keeps you invested in the narrative and the fascinating characters etched out brilliantly by Vignesh." The Hindu stated "For a film that handles serious topics, TSK remains a feel good, light-hearted film, tailor-made for the festival weekend".Film Companion rated 3 out of 5 stars stating "Vignesh Shivn’s mass-ified remake of Special 26, starring Suriya, is quite entertaining."Behindwoods rated 2.8 stars out of 5 stating "A smart heist film!" The Indian Express rated 2.5 stars out of 5 stating "Walk in without expectation and let the Suriya and Keerthy Suresh starrer’s humour entertain you. As hard as the film tries to be serious, it is tough to take it so."Deccan Chronicle rated 3.5 out of 5 stars stating "Thaanaa Serndha Koottam is a fast paced heist that barely wastes a minute in portraying a comedic entertainer."IndiaGlitz rated 3 out of 5 stars stating "TSK is yet another feather in the cap moment for Vignesh Shivan. The timing of the movie could not have been better with IT raids becoming a routine in TN, a light hearted take on the raids makes the film an enjoyable watch." Cinestaan rated 2 out of 5 stars stating "If you haven't watched the Hindi film Special 26 (2013), chances are you will like Thaanaa Serndha Koottam."

Box office 
The film collected 19cr from worldwide box office in its opening day of which 6.5cr in Tamil Nadu,1.9cr in Kerala, 1.1cr in Karnataka and over 9.5cr from rest of India and World. The film collected 90.2 cr worldwide during its lifetime.

References

External links 
 

2010s crime comedy films
2010s heist films
2010s masala films
2010s Tamil-language films
2018 films
Central Bureau of Investigation in fiction
Comedy films based on actual events
Crime films based on actual events
Films scored by Anirudh Ravichander
Films shot in Chennai
Indian crime comedy films
Indian films based on actual events
Indian heist films
Tamil remakes of Hindi films